The Charleston and Savannah Railway was a 19th-century American railroad serving the coastal states of South Carolina and Georgia and running through part of the South Carolina Lowcountry. Its name varied slightly over time:

 Charleston and Savannah Railroad (1854–1866)
 Savannah and Charleston Railroad (1866–1880)
 Charleston and Savannah Railway (1880–1901)

History
The system was originally chartered in 1854 as the Charleston and Savannah Railroad. The C&S RR established and operated a   gauge rail line from Charleston, South Carolina, to Savannah, Georgia, connecting two of the most important port cities in the antebellum southeastern United States. South Carolina state senator Thomas Drayton was the president of the railroad from its earliest planning stages in 1853 until 1856.

During the Civil War, control of the railroad was vital to the protection of Savannah and keeping nearby Confederate troops supplied with food and materiel. In December 1864, during his March to the Sea, Maj. Gen. William T. Sherman sent part of his Union forces forward to cut the line, which would force Confederate general William Hardee to retreat and abandon Savannah. The mission failed, but sections of the railroad would be severely damaged during Sherman's subsequent 1865 Carolinas Campaign.

Following the war, the railroad was reorganized in 1866 as the Savannah and Charleston Railroad but did not complete repairs and reopen for traffic as a  line until 1869-70.  In 1873 it defaulted on a loan and ended up in bankruptcy.  It was then sold to Henry B. Plant (June, 1880s), and the railroad's name was changed to the Charleston and Savannah Railway, becoming part of the Plant System of railroads.

In 1877, the Ashley River Railroad (another Plant System Railroad) was built.  The Ashley River Railroad connected to the Charleston and Savannah Railway at Johns Island and ran across the Ashley River to connect with the Northeastern Railroad in North Charleston.  The Charleston and Savannah Railway previously connected to other railroads via a ferry across the river.

In the 1880s, the Plant System built a branch from Ravenel southeast to Yonges Island.  This now-abandoned branch ran through Hollywood and Meggett.

Later, the Plant System was sold to the Atlantic Coast Line Railroad in 1902.  The Charleston and Savannah Railway and the Ashley River Railroad would become part of the Atlantic Coast Line's main line (which extended in its entirety from Richmond, Virginia to Tampa, Florida).  The Hardeville to Savannah track was also used by the Southern Railway to connect a Columbia-Hardeville section of track to Florida. 

The original line east of Johns Island would become known as the Croghans Branch after the Ashley River Railroad began service. 
The Croghans Branch has since been abandoned and its right of way is now the West Ashley Greenway.

In 1967, the Atlantic Coast Line merged with its rival, the Seaboard Air Line Railroad.  The merged company was named the Seaboard Coast Line Railroad.
In 1980, the Seaboard Coast Line's parent company merged with the Chessie System, creating the CSX Corporation.  The CSX Corporation initially operated the Chessie and Seaboard Systems separately until 1986, when they were merged into CSX Transportation.  The line is still in service from Johns Island to Savannah and it is part of CSX's A Line (Charleston Subdivision).

Station Listing

See also
Charleston Subdivision

References

External links
 Tenth Annual Report to the stockholders
 Records of the Charleston and Savannah Railroad, in Special Collections at the College of Charleston

Further reading
 Stone, H. David, Vital Rails: The Charleston & Savannah Railroad and the Civil War in Coastal South Carolina, University of South Carolina Press, 2008. .

Defunct South Carolina railroads
Defunct Georgia (U.S. state) railroads
Railway companies established in 1880
Railway companies disestablished in 1901
Georgia (U.S. state) in the American Civil War
South Carolina in the American Civil War
History of Savannah, Georgia
Predecessors of the Atlantic Coast Line Railroad
Transportation in Charleston, South Carolina
American companies established in 1880
5 ft gauge railways in the United States
19th-century in Charleston, South Carolina